Ismail Al-Amour (born 2 October 1984) is a Palestinian footballer currently playing for Shabab Alsamu of the West Bank Premier League as a midfielder. He is known for his blistering pace and trickery.

International goals
Scores and results list Palestine's goal tally first.

External links

1984 births
Living people
Palestinian footballers
Shabab Al-Dhahiriya SC players
Jabal Al-Mukaber Club players
Markaz Shabab Al-Am'ari players
Hilal Al-Quds Club players
West Bank Premier League players
Palestine international footballers
Palestinian expatriate footballers
Palestinian expatriate sportspeople in Jordan
People from Gaza City
2015 AFC Asian Cup players
Association football midfielders